Jar Khoshk may refer to:
 Jar Khoshk-e Olya
 Jar Khoshk-e Sofla